Ymer is a Danish soured milk product with 6 percent protein. Compared to standard yogurt, it has a thicker, creamier consistency and a higher protein content. It has a slightly buttery taste and may be very subtly fizzy due to slight carbonation from the lactic fermentation. It was launched commercially in 1930s. It is made by fermenting whole milk with the bacterial culture Lactococcus lactis. 

Ymer is named after the primordial being Ymir in Norse mythology. In 1937, dairyman E. Larsen in Hatting registered his new soured milk product as ymer; the name was then used by other dairies that began making the product. Modern Danes will usually be more familiar with ymer as the name of the dairy product than as a creature of the Norse mythology.

Industrially, it is made with the help of a starter culture, which is today -- rather than full milk -- added to skimmed milk (milk of typically 0.1 % fat content). It is kept at 18 °C until the pH drops to 4.6. The serum is broken down and drained after fermentation, and cream is added to adjust the fat content. Unlike other fermented milk products, ymer is drained of its whey. That means that ymer has a higher content of solids, including protein, while the fat content stays at 3.5% as in whole milk.

Ymer is mostly eaten for breakfasts or as a snack, but can be used in all ways as an alternative to yogurt, in desserts, dressings and baking.

One deciliter of ymer contains 146 kJ (35 kilocalories).

See also 

 List of dairy products

References 
 Barry A. Law (Editor): Microbiology and biochemistry of cheese and fermented milk. Springer, Heidelberg 1997.
 Adnan Tamime (Editor): Structure of Dairy Products. Blackwell Publishing, Oxford 2007.

Fermented dairy products
Danish cuisine
Ymir